Al Minns (1 January 1920 – 24 April 1985), was a prominent American Lindy Hop and jazz dancer. Most famous for his film and stage performances in the 1930s and 1940s with the Harlem-based Whitey's Lindy Hoppers, Minns worked throughout his life to promote the dances that he and his cohorts helped to pioneer at New York's Savoy Ballroom.

Minns also played a part in the revival of Lindy Hop in the 1980s, when he was invited to Stockholm in 1984 by The Rhythm Hot Shots dance company to teach the dance the way he knew it. The group had until then mainly used old film clips as a source for their interpretation of Lindy Hop.

In 1938, Al Minns and Sandra Gibson (see Mildred Pollard) won the Harvest Moon Ball.

Filmography

 Hellzapoppin' (1941)
 Hot Chocolates (1941)
 The Spirit Moves (1950)
 Jazz Dance (1954)

See also
 Al & Leon

External links
Streetswing.com

American male dancers
Lindy Hop
1920 births
1985 deaths
20th-century American dancers